Allison is an unincorporated community in Decatur County, Kansas, United States.

History
A post office was opened in Allison in 1880, and remained in operation until it was discontinued in 1919.

Education
The community is served by Hoxie USD 412 public school district.

References

Further reading

External links
 Decatur County maps: Current, Historic, KDOT

Unincorporated communities in Decatur County, Kansas
Unincorporated communities in Kansas